Rivadavia Airport is a public use airport located  south of Rivadavia, a town in the Mendoza Province of Argentina.

See also

Transport in Argentina
List of airports in Argentina
Talk:Rivadavia Airport

References 

Airports in Argentina
Mendoza Province